Megachile philippinensis is a species of bee in the family Megachilidae. It was described by Friese in 1916.

References

Philippinensis
Insects described in 1916